Bufotes luristanicus, the Lorestan earless toad or Lorestan toad (not to be confused with Luristan toad), is a species of toad in the family Bufonidae. Little is known about this species, but it is not considered threatened overall. Some local populations may be threatened by habitat loss from human activities or drought.

It resembles its close relative B. surdus (Luristan (earless) toad). Both are relatively small, dull-coloured and with no or a tiny tympanum. Unlike most Bufotes species, the adults never have large and conspicuous green spots to the upperpart of their body. They have no greenish spots at all, except sometimes on their limbs, or small and often ring-shaped spots. In juveniles, the spots are relatively larger.

References

luristanicus
Endemic fauna of Iran
Amphibians of Iran
Taxa named by Karl Patterson Schmidt
Amphibians described in 1952
Taxonomy articles created by Polbot